London Design Festival is a citywide design event that takes place over nine days every September across London. It was conceived by Sir John Sorrell and Ben Evans CBE in 2003 and celebrated its 20th edition in September 2022. 

In an article by Wallpaper, the festive chairman Sir John Sorrell stated, "We consciously founded the London Design Festival to be public spirited. Over the last 20 years, the Festival has had incredible depth of penetration and success in bringing people together and distilling new ideas.".

About 
The Festival is made up of over 400 events and exhibitions staged by over 300 partner organisations across the design spectrum and from around the world. The Festival also commissions and curates its own program of Landmark Projects, Projects at the Victoria and Albert Museum and Special Commissions throughout the city.

The Festival annually attracts a direct audience of over 600,000 visitors from over 75 countries. On average over 2,000 design businesses participate each year including brands and universities. 

The Festival also has events including its though-leadership programme the Global Design Forum, talks, keynotes, daily tours, and workshops. In 2019 it had 50 speakers from 18 countries and 2,800 visitors.

Landmark Projects 
 
The Festival commissions and curates large-scale installations across the city in indoor and outdoor locations. The installations are developed and shown during the Festival, with many later being shown in other cities or locations in following months or years. Working with businesses and designers, previous Landmark Projects have included Sclera by David Adjaye (2008), Endless Stair by Alex de Rijke (2013), The Smile by Alison Brooks Architects (2016), Medusa by Tin Drum and Sou Foujimoto (2021), and INTO SIGHT by Sony Design (2022).

Location  
Since 2009, the Victoria and Albert Museum has been the central hub for the London Design Festival, celebrating fourteen years of partnership in 2022.

In 2022, twelve Design Districts across London participated - Bankside, Brompton, Pimlico Road, Clerkenwell, King's Cross, Design District (Greenwich Peninsula), Mayfair, Shoreditch, Islington, Park Royal, William Morris Design Line and Southwark. Other districts have participated in previous editions including Paddington Central, West Kensington, Marylebone, and Chelsea.

Awards 

Each year a jury composed of established designers, industry commentators and previous winners choose recipients of The London Design Medals across four categories. Winners are chosen from a wide range of design disciplines and awarded for their contribution to their field.

The London Design Medal categories include:
 London Design Medal: The highest accolade bestowed upon an individual who has distinguished themselves within the industry and demonstrated consistent design excellence.
 Design Innovation Medal: Celebrates entrepreneurship in all its forms, both locally and internationally. It honours an individual for whom design lies at the core of their development and success.
 Emerging Talent Medal: Recognises an impact made on the design scene within five or so years of graduation.
 Lifetime Achievement Medal: Honours a significant and fundamental contribution to the design industry over the course of a career.

Festival Director Ben Evens stated “While there is no shortage of design awards, we wanted to do it differently. So we took the Nobel Prize route – there’s no shortlist, just a winner. So that means there’s no losers either.”

The London Design Medal is designed each year by jewellery designer Hannah Martin. The Medals feature a London bird, the Cockney Sparrow, in flight.

Previous medal winners include Don McCullin, Sandy Powell, Michael Wolf (graphic designer), Dame Vivienne Westwood, Tom Dixon, Neri Oxman, Hussein Chalayan, Grace Wales Bonner, Eva Jiricna, Es Devlin, Margaret Calvert, Sir David Adjaye, Kenneth Grange, Bethan Laura Wood, Daan Roosegaard, Marjan Van Aubel, Nicolas Roope, Dieter Rams, David Constantine, Jane Ni Dhulchaointigh, Vidal Sassoon, Sir Ken Adam, Peter Saville, Marc Newson, Sir Paul Smith, Dame Zaha Hadid, Thomas Heatherwick, Sir Terence Conran, and Ron Arad.

References

Design Festival
British design exhibitions
Festivals established in 2003
Design events